Franz Anton Hoffmeister (12 May 1754 – 9 February 1812) was an Austrian composer and music publisher.

Early years 

Franz Anton Hoffmeister was born in Rottenburg am Neckar (Further Austria) on 12 May 1754. At the age of fourteen, he went to Vienna to study law.  Following his studies, however, he decided on a career in music and by the 1780s he had become one of the city’s most popular composers, with an extensive and varied catalogue of works to his credit.

Hoffmeister’s reputation today rests mainly on his activities as a music publisher. By 1785 he had established one of Vienna’s first music publishing businesses, second only to Artaria & Co, which had ventured into the field five years earlier.

Hoffmeister published his own works as well as those of many important composers of the time, including Haydn, Mozart, Beethoven, Clementi, Johann Georg Albrechtsberger, Carl Ditters von Dittersdorf and Johann Baptist Wanhal. These famous composers were also among Hoffmeister's personal friends: Mozart dedicated his String Quartet in D to him and Beethoven addressed him in a letter as my "most beloved brother".

Compositions 

Hoffmeister’s publishing activities reached a peak in 1791, but thereafter he appeared to have devoted more time to composition. Most of his operas were composed and staged during the early 1790s and this, combined with an apparent lack of business sense, led to his noticeable decline as a publisher.

Publishing interests 

In 1799, Hoffmeister and the flautist Franz Thurner set off on a concert tour which was to have taken them as far afield as London. They got no further than Leipzig, where Hoffmeister befriended the organist Ambrosius Kühnel. The two men decided to set up a music publishing partnership and "within a year" had founded the 'Bureau de Musique', which was eventually taken over by the well-respected C.F. Peters, a firm that is still active today. Among the publications of the Bureau de Musique was the first edition of Johann Sebastian Bach's Keyboard Works in 14 volumes (1802). The publisher Friedrich Hofmeister (founder of Friedrich Hofmeister Musikverlag) learnt his trade, in part, whilst working as an assistant in the Bureau de Musique. Until 1805, Hoffmeister kept both the Viennese firm and his newer Leipzig publishing house going, but in March 1805 he transferred sole ownership of the Bureau de Musique to Kühnel. His interest in the Viennese firm also waned, for in 1806, apparently to allow time for composition, he sold the 20-year-old business to the Chemische Druckerey.

As a composer, Hoffmeister was highly respected by his contemporaries, as can be seen in the entry, published in the year of his death, in Gerber's Neues Lexikon der Tonkünstler:
If you were to take a glance at his many and varied works, then you would have to admire the diligence and the cleverness of this composer.... He earned for himself a well-deserved and wide-spread reputation through the original content of his works, which are not only rich in emotional expression but also distinguished by the interesting and suitable use of instruments and through good practicability. For this last trait we have to thank his knowledge of instruments, which is so evident that you might think that he was a virtuoso on all of the instruments for which he wrote.

Works 

Prominent in Hoffmeister’s extensive oeuvre are works for the flute, including more than 25 concertos as well as chamber works with the flute in a leading role. Many of these works would have been composed with Vienna’s growing number of amateur musicians in mind, for whom the flute was one of the most favoured instruments. Hoffmeister also composed at least eight operas, over 50 symphonies, numerous concertos (including an often-played concerto for the viola), a large amount of string chamber music, piano music and several collections of songs.

Selected works

With opus number
 Duo for two Flutes Op. 31/3
 Duets for Violin & Violoncello 1-3 Op. 6
 Duets for Violin & Viola 1-3 Op. 7
 String Quartets 1-6 Op. 7?
 String Quartets 1-6 Op. 10
 Duets for Violin & Viola 1-6 Op. 13
 String Quartets 1-3 Op. 14
 Duets for Violin & Viola 1-6 Op. 19
 Quartetti Concertanti 1-3 Op. 29
 String Quintet Op. 62
 Duets for Violin & Viola 1-6 Op. 65

Without opus number

 6 Airs for 2 flutes
 Clarinet Concerto in Bb 
 Oboe Concerto in C major 
 6 Caprices for Solo Violin
 12 Etudes for Viola
 12 Variations for Flute and Strings
 Viola Concerto in D major
 Viola Concerto in B-flat major
 Concerti for Double Bass

References

Literature
 Clive, Peter, Mozart and His Circle: A Biographical Dictionary (New Haven: Yale University Press, 1993), pp. 160–161
 Lawford-Hinrichsen, Irene, Music Publishing and Patronage: C. F. Peters: 1800 to the Holocaust (Kenyon: Edition Press, 2000), pp. 3–7

External links
 
Entry in the Oxford Dictionary of Music
A summary of the history of C. F. Peters

1754 births
1812 deaths
18th-century German people
18th-century German composers
18th-century male musicians
German expatriates in Austria
People from Rottenburg am Neckar
German music publishers (people)
String quartet composers
Composers for double bass